United States gubernatorial elections were held in three states in 2015 as part of the 2015 United States elections. In Kentucky and Mississippi, the elections were held on November 3, and in Louisiana, as no candidate received a majority of votes at the primary election on October 24, 2015, a runoff election was held on November 21. The last regular gubernatorial elections for all three states were in 2011. Democrats picked up the open seat of term-limited Republican Bobby Jindal in Louisiana, while Republicans re-elected incumbent Phil Bryant in Mississippi and picked up the seat of term-limited Democrat Steve Beshear in Kentucky.

Election predictions

Race summary

Closest races 
States where the margin of victory was under 10%:

 Kentucky, 8.70%

Red denotes states won by Republicans.

Kentucky 

Two-term incumbent Democratic Governor Steve Beshear, was unable to run for a third term in 2015 due to term limits established under the Kentucky Constitution. To succeed Beshear, Democrats nominated Attorney General of Kentucky Jack Conway. Conway's running mate was State Representative Sannie Overly. For the Republicans, businessman and candidate for the U.S. Senate in 2014 Matt Bevin ran on a ticket with Tea Party activist and 2014 State House candidate Jenean Hampton. Bevin narrowly defeated Agriculture Commissioner James Comer to win the Republican nomination. Drew Curtis, the founder of Fark, ran as an independent, polling well enough to appear in the Bluegrass Poll gubernatorial debate. Bevin ultimately defeated Conway, winning 53% of the vote to Conway's 44%.

Louisiana 

Two-term incumbent Republican Governor Bobby Jindal was term-limited in 2015 and thus unable to seek reelection. Under Louisiana's jungle primary system, all candidates, regardless of party, appear on the same ballot. The primary was held on October 24, 2015, with Democrat John Bel Edwards at 40% of the vote and Republican David Vitter at 23%. As no candidate won a majority of the vote, a runoff election between Edwards and Vitter was held on November 21, 2015. Edwards won the runoff election with 56.1% of the vote, becoming the first Democrat to win a statewide election in Louisiana since 2008.

Three Republicans ran for the office: Public Service Commissioner and former Lieutenant Governor of Louisiana Scott Angelle, incumbent Lieutenant Governor Jay Dardenne and U.S. Senator David Vitter. Potential Republican candidates included former Secretary of the Louisiana Department of Veterans Affairs and former U.S. Representative Rodney Alexander, Louisiana State Treasurer John Neely Kennedy, State Senator Gerald Long and former governor, former U.S. Representative and candidate for president in 2012 Buddy Roemer.

Three Democrats ran: 2011 candidate Cary Deaton, Minority Leader of the Louisiana House of Representatives John Bel Edwards and minister Jeremy Odom.

Mississippi 

One-term incumbent Republican Governor Phil Bryant nominated for a second and final term. He had won a resounding victory over his Democratic opponent four years earlier, carrying 61% of the vote. Truck driver Robert Gray was nominated by the Democrats to oppose Bryant in the general election. Bryant won the election in a landslide, winning 67% of the vote to Gray's 32%.

Notes

References